William Greene (died 13 January 1843) was Dean of Achonry from 1821 until 1824 when he became the Rector of Ahoghill.

References

1843 deaths
Alumni of Trinity College Dublin
Irish Anglicans
Deans of Achonry